Saitis annae is a species of jumping spider in the family Salticidae.

It found in the Caribbean−West Indies, including on Jamaica.

See also
 

Spiders of the Caribbean
Fauna of Jamaica
Spiders described in 1894
annae
Arthropods of the Dominican Republic